Maricourt Lake is a freshwater body crossed by the Macho River in the north-eastern part of Senneterre within La Vallée-de-l'Or Regional County Municipality (RCM), in the administrative region of Abitibi-Témiscamingue, in Quebec, Canada.

Lake Maricourt is located entirely in the township of Maricourt. Forestry is the main economic activity of the sector. Recreational tourism activities come second.

The hydrographic slope of Lac Maricourt is accessible through a forest road (East-West direction) that passes on the north side of Maricourt Lake, passing through the Lake Wetetnagami Biodiversity Reserve; in addition, another forest road (East-West direction) serves the southern part of this Reserve and the west side of Lake Maricourt.

The surface of Lac Maricourt is usually frozen from early November to mid-May, however, safe ice circulation is generally from mid-November to mid-April.

Geography

Toponymy 
The main hydrographic slopes near Lac Maricourt are:
north side: Macho River, Closse River;
east side: Closse River, Mégiscane River, Lake Misères, Mégiscane Lake, Canusio Lake;
south side: Berthelot Lake (Mégiscane River), Mégiscane River, Whitegoose River, Mégiscane Lake;
west side: Achepabanca River North-East, Achepabanca Lake, Delestres River.

Toponymy
The origin of hydronyms "Lac Maricourt" and "Canton Maricourt" are linked. The term "Maricourt" is a family name of French origin and a commune in France.

The toponym "lac Maricourt" was formalized on December 5, 1968, by the Commission de toponymie du Québec, when it was created.

Notes and references

See also 

Lakes of Abitibi-Témiscamingue
Nottaway River drainage basin